Prankstar is an unreleased mockumentary independent film written by, directed by, and starring Tom Green.

Plot 
Two student filmmakers decide to follow Tom Green on a trip across the US to Canada but get more than they bargained for. The crew witness Tom receiving insults and documents Tom's loneliness due to his fading fame. When returning to his hometown near Ottawa, things are not much better as the public continues to torment him about his past.

Before Tom and his crew know it, they are getting in trouble all around North America and frightening events force them to flee from the law.

Production 
In 2006, Elixir Films was producing Prankstar and had additional information of the film on their website. The film was shot in Ottawa, Ontario, Regina, Saskatchewan and Los Angeles, California.

Little is known about the release of this film but on a February 2010 interview, the star and director of the movie Tom Green stated that Prankstar has just been finished, that the release has been "in the can" and that he is going to figure out what to do with the film soon as he is currently on his world stand-up comedy tour. On February 17, 2010, on Green's website TomGreen.com, in reply to a fan question asking when Prankstar would be released, Green wrote, "Stay tuned! It's the craziest movie I have ever made!!"

On a March 19, 2010 interview with 105.7: The Point St. Louis radio, Green said that Prankstar should be coming out later in 2010. On a November 2010 answer to a fan question in the Forum section of tomgreen.com, Green stated that the film was going to be released sometime in 2011 as he has "just made a deal with a big time distributor so it's gonna be cool."

References

External links 
 
 Tom Green Interview on Punchline Magazine - February 16, 2010

Films directed by Tom Green
Unreleased American films
American mockumentary films